Snapshots is a 2018 American independent drama film directed by Melanie Mayron and starring Piper Laurie and Brooke Adams.

Cast
Piper Laurie as Rose
Emily Baldoni as Allison
Brooke Adams as Patty
Shannon Collis as Young Rose
Emily Goss as Louise
Brett Dier as Zee
Max Adler as Joe
Cathy DeBuono

Reception
The film has  rating on Rotten Tomatoes.

Guy Lodge of Variety gave the film a negative review and wrote, "Snapshots wallows a little too readily in cliché to be quite as stirring as its story - one drawn from Corran's own family history - sounds on paper."

Frank Scheck of The Hollywood Reporter gave the film a positive review and wrote, "And while the pacing can be a little too leisurely at times, it doesn't prevent Snapshots from being a mature, reflective drama that is all the more effective for its restraint."

Paul Parcellin of Film Threat also gave the film a positive review and wrote, "Fortunately, the film avoids taking us down a predictable path and instead provides what feels like a more true to life recollection of days gone by."

References

External links
 
 

2018 drama films
2018 independent films
2018 LGBT-related films
American drama films
American independent films
American LGBT-related films
Films directed by Melanie Mayron
Films scored by David Michael Frank
Lesbian-related films
LGBT-related drama films
2010s English-language films
2010s American films